Leskovca is a settlement in the Municipality of Laško in eastern Slovenia. It lies in the hills east of Laško. The area is part of the traditional region of Styria. It is now included with the rest of the municipality in the Savinja Statistical Region.

References

External links
Leskovca on Geopedia

Populated places in the Municipality of Laško